Leslie Claudis O'Neal (born May 7, 1964) is an American former professional football player who was a defensive end and outside linebacker for 13 years in the National Football League (NFL). He spent the majority of his career with the San Diego Chargers before finishing with the St. Louis Rams and Kansas City Chiefs. He was a three-time All-Pro and six-time Pro Bowl selection during his pro career.

O'Neal was a two-time All-American playing college football with the Oklahoma State Cowboys. He joined the Chargers after they selected him in the first round with the eighth overall pick in the 1986 NFL draft. He was named NFL Defensive Rookie of the Year, but suffered a major knee injury at the end of his first season.  He returned within two years, and finished his career as the Chargers all-time leader in sacks.

College career
O'Neal played college football for the Oklahoma State Cowboys, and twice earned All-American honors. He was a Big Eight Defensive Player of the Year, and earned All-Big Eight honors for three consecutive years. He finished his Cowboys career ranked fifth all-time in tackles with 351.

On March 11, 2020, O’Neal was elected to the College Football Hall of Fame as a player. He is Oklahoma State’s sixth member of the Hall of Fame.

Professional career
O'Neal was chosen in the first round with the eighth overall pick in the 1986 NFL draft by the San Diego Chargers. He was named the NFL Defensive Rookie of the Year in 1986 after recording  sacks for the season, including a team-record five on November 16 against the Dallas Cowboys.  However, his season ended prematurely due to a knee injury that sidelined him for almost two seasons.

He returned during the 1988 season on October 16, and returned to his dominant form the following season, when he again had  sacks, and was rewarded with the first of six Pro Bowl selections. O'Neal led the Chargers in sacks every season from 1990 through 1995, earning three second-team All-Pro selections in that span. In 1992, he led the American Football Conference (AFC) with a career-high 17 sacks. He played his final four seasons with the St. Louis Rams and Kansas City Chiefs.

He finished his Chargers career as the team's all-time leader in sacks. He was named to the Chargers 40th and 50th anniversary teams, and was inducted to the Chargers Hall of Fame as well as the Oklahoma Sports Hall of Fame in 2014.

See also
List of National Football League career sacks leaders

References

External links

1964 births
Living people
All-American college football players
American Conference Pro Bowl players
American football defensive ends
American football linebackers
Kansas City Chiefs players
National Football League Defensive Rookie of the Year Award winners
Oklahoma State Cowboys football players
San Diego Chargers players
St. Louis Rams players
Sportspeople from Little Rock, Arkansas
Hall High School (Arkansas) alumni
100 Sacks Club
Ed Block Courage Award recipients